Lenyra is a genus of moths in the family Sesiidae.

Species
Lenyra ashtaroth (Westwood, 1848)

References

Sesiidae